Rosalba "Sal" Abreu García (born November 18, 1992) is a Dominican model and beauty pageant titleholder who won Miss Dominican Republic 2016. She represented Dominican Republic at the Miss Universe 2016 pageant.

Early life
García was born in Maimón. She is an international model who has modeled for various Dominican fashion brands for many years. She has appeared on the covers of ‘Oh Magazine’ and 'Elite Europe’. At age 14, Sal García was discovered by Sandro Guzmán, the president of Management for Elite Models at its Paris, New York City and Barcelona branches. Later, Garcia signed with Red Model Management in New York, Hollywood Model Management in Los Angeles, and Leni Model Management in London.

Career
Garcia has modeled for designers and fashion houses from around the world including Jean-Paul Gaultier, Salvatore Ferragamo, Gucci, Prada, Carolina Herrera, Elie Saab, Naeem Khan, and Oscar de la Renta.

In 2015, she walked in the Mercedes-Benz Fashion Week New York for brands and designers like Venexiana, Katia Leonovich, Ødd, TheblondsNY, Aede Jean Pierre, David Tlale, and Farah Angsana. That same year, Garcia appeared in New York Fashion Week, where she participated in the final runway of Kelly Dempsey in season 14 of the reality show Project Runway.

Pageantry

Miss Dominican Republic 2016
García was crowned as Miss Dominican Republic 2016 on April 24, 2016 at the Hotel Jaragua in the city of Santo Domingo.

Miss Universe 2016
García represented the Dominican Republic at the Miss Universe 2016 pageant but Unplaced.

References

1992 births
Living people
Miss Universe 2016 contestants
Dominican Republic female models